Zhao Yingjie (born 2 August 1992) is a Chinese professional footballer who currently plays for as a midfielder for Tianjin Teda in the Chinese Super League.

Club career
Zhao started his professional career with Chinese Super League side Tianjin Teda in the 2011 league season when he was included their senior team squad. He would not make any first team appearances for the club and was sent to the reserve team throughout the 2012 campaign, however by 2013 Zhao was loaned to China League One side Tianjin Songjiang to gain some playing time. In 2014, Zhao was loaned out once more, this time to China League Two side Lijiang Jiayunhao. Upon his return Zhao would be placed in the reserve team throughout the 2015 campaign and would not make his debut for the club until 22 October 2016, when he came on as a substitute for Fredy Montero in the 72nd minute against Hebei China Fortune in a 2016 Chinese Super League game that ended in a 5-0 defeat.

Career statistics 
Statistics accurate as of match played 31 December 2020.

References

External links
 

1992 births
Living people
Chinese footballers
Footballers from Tianjin
Tianjin Jinmen Tiger F.C. players
Tianjin Tianhai F.C. players
Yunnan Flying Tigers F.C. players
Chinese Super League players
China League One players
China League Two players
Association football defenders